Legislative elections were held in Israel on 28 October 1969 to elect members of the seventh Knesset. The ruling Alignment coalition was returned to power with the largest number of seats ever won in an Israeli election (56 out of 120).  This was attributed to the government's popularity following the country's victory in the Six-Day War, and that the Alignment had been formed by an alliance of the four most popular left-wing parties, who between them had received 51.2% of the vote in the previous elections in 1965. As a result, Golda Meir remained Prime Minister. Voter turnout was 81.7%.

Parliament factions

The table below lists the parliamentary factions represented in the 6th Knesset.

Results

Aftermath

Golda Meir of the Alignment formed the fifteenth government, a national unity government including Gahal, the National Religious Party, the Independent Liberals, Progress and Development and Cooperation and Brotherhood. There were 24 ministers. Gahal resigned from the coalition on 6 August 1970 after the government had decided to adopt the Rogers Plan.

The seventh Knesset was one of the most stable, with only three MKs changing parties; Meir Avizohar left the National List in 1972 to sit as an independent, before joining the Alignment the following year; Avner Shaki left the National Religious Party in 1972 and sat as an independent; and Shalom Cohen left HaOlam HaZeh – Koah Hadash in 1972.

References

External links
Historical overview of the Seventh Knesset Knesset 
Election results Knesset
The Seventh Knesset Knesset

Israel
Legislative election
Legislative elections in Israel
October 1969 events in Asia
Israel